Mikaela Hoover (born July 12, 1984) is an American actress of Iranian and Italian descent.

Early life and education
Mikaela was born and raised in Colbert, Washington. She started taking dance classes at the age of two and starred in school plays and appeared in local commercials as a child. She was accepted to Loyola Marymount University's theatre program in Los Angeles and graduated with her bachelor's degree in theatre.

Career
Hoover made her acting debut in 2007, in the movie Frank. She then went on to book a leading role in Sorority Forever. Shortly after, Hoover got a role in Humanzee after auditioning in front of James Gunn and following that she got offered the lead role in the James Gunn and Peter Safran Xbox show Sparky & Mikaela.

During 2010, Hoover began appearing in American productions with a guest role in How I Met Your Mother. She also got a role in the James Gunn movie Super.

In 2011, she had a recurring role in the television series Happy Endings as Jackie and in 2012, she appeared in Anger Management.

In 2013, Hoover had roles in the American television productions Two and a Half Men and The League, followed by a role in Saint George in 2014.

Hoover continued to work with James Gunn and in 2014 she played Nova Prime's Assistant in the Marvel movie Guardians of the Galaxy and Raziya Memarian in The Belko Experiment.

In 2017, Hoover appeared in the television series 2 Broke Girls, The Guest Book and Lucifer.

In 2020, she booked a role in DC's The Suicide Squad, Lionsgate's Guest House and Netflix's Holidate.

Filmography

References

External links

1984 births
Living people
American film actresses
American television actresses
Loyola Marymount University alumni
Actresses from Washington (state)
People from Spokane County, Washington
21st-century American actresses
American people of Italian descent
American people of Iranian descent